Tain Royal Academy is a secondary school in Highland, Scotland. The school first opened in 1813, with a new building opened in 1969 and an educational campus currently being built, due to open in 2018.  Tain Royal Academy is part of the Golspie, Invergordon & Tain associated school group, consisting of 
Golspie High School, Invergordon Academy and Tain.

 it has a school roll of 590 pupils.

History
In 1809 a royal charter was signed by King George III for an academy to be built in Tain. The school opened in 1813. A new school building was opened in 1969, extended in 1978.

A £45million campus with facilities catering for three to 18 year olds is to be located on the existing Tain Royal Academy site. In 2015, these plans were approved by Highland Council and then Scottish Government Ministers.

Notable former pupils

 Dr Robert Cameron MacKenzie FRSE (1920-2000) Head of the Macaulay Institute
 Thomas Summers West, chemist.
 Professor Sir John Fraser Bt.(1885-1947) Surgeon and principal of the University of Edinburgh

References

External links
 

Educational institutions established in 1813
Secondary schools in Highland (council area)
1813 establishments in Scotland